Laura Coates is an American attorney and legal analyst for CNN, as well as the host of the 11 p.m. hour of CNN Tonight. Since 2017, she has hosted a talk radio show, The Laura Coates Show, on SiriusXM's Urban View. In January 2021, The Laura Coates Show moved to SiriusXM's POTUS.

Education 
Coates graduated with a B.A. from the Princeton School of Public and International Affairs in 2001 after completing a 122-page-long senior thesis, titled "The Legacy of Southern Redemption: An Examination of Felon Disenfranchisement Policy," under the supervision of Russ Nieli. 

In 2005, she received her J.D. from the University of Minnesota Law School in Minneapolis, Minnesota.

Legal career 

Coates began her legal career in Minnesota working as an associate attorney at the firm of Faegre & Benson. She left Faegre to become an associate at the New York City law firm of Kasowitz, Benson, Torres & Friedman.

She moved from private practice to the United States Department of Justice as a federal prosecutor. She was a trial attorney in the Civil Rights Division of the Department of Justice during the Bush and Obama administrations, specializing in the enforcement of voting rights throughout the country. She was also an Assistant United States Attorney for the District of Columbia, prosecuting violent felony offenses, including drug trafficking, armed offenses, domestic violence, child abuse and sexual assault. She is not currently a practicing attorney and is on inactive status with the Office of Lawyer Registration at the Minnesota Supreme Court.

Television 

In May 2016, she joined CNN as a legal analyst and is currently a CNN senior legal analyst.  In 2019, Coates hosted two TV documentaries on the Oxygen Network.  The first, The Disappearance of the Millbrook Twins, follows Coates as she investigates the disappearance of 15-year-old twins in Augusta, Georgia. She also hosted the mini-series documentary Murder and Justice: The Case of Martha Moxley, investigating the death of 15-year-old Martha Moxley in Greenwich, Connecticut.

In September of 2022, Coates was selected as an interim host of CNN Tonight along with Jake Tapper and Alisyn Camerota throughout the 2022 midterm elections where she helmed the 11 p.m. hour. 

In January of 2023, it was announced that Coates will be the permanent host of the 11 p.m. hour of CNN Tonight.

Publications 
Coates has written features and offering research to major publications, such as The Washington Post and the Boston Herald. Her first book, published in January 2016, was a legal guide entitled, You have the Right: A Constitutional Guide to Policing the Police. Coates' second book, Just Pursuit: A Black Prosecutor's Fight for Fairness, was released in January 2022. It is about her experience as a black female federal prosecutor at the US Department of Justice.

Teaching 
Coates is an adjunct law professor at the George Washington University School of Law and routinely speaks across the country on civil rights, social justice, economic empowerment and other topics.

Personal life 
Born in Saint Paul, Minnesota, Coates resides in Washington, D.C. with her husband and two children.

In July 2018, Coates was suggested by Jeopardy! host Alex Trebek as a possible replacement once his contract was completed.

References

External links 
 Laura Coates biography at CNN

African-American television personalities
African-American women lawyers
American television news anchors
African-American lawyers
American talk radio hosts
Living people
American women television journalists
Princeton School of Public and International Affairs alumni
University of Minnesota Law School alumni
CNN people
1980 births
21st-century African-American people
21st-century African-American women
20th-century African-American people
20th-century African-American women
21st-century American lawyers
21st-century American women lawyers